Tin Chiu Street is a street in Tsat Tsz Mui of North Point in Hong Kong.

Location
Tin Chiu Street runs south to north, from the base of the hill to Victoria Harbour. The street starts at the junction of Tanner Road and Kai Yuen Street. It intersects with Tsat Tsz Mui Road, King's Road, Marble Road and Java Road.

History
During World War II, the northern section of today's Tin Chiu Street and King's Road Playground were occupied by parts of North Point Camp, initially a refugee camp, and later a prisoner-of-war camp. There is no on-site memorial.

Features
A major office building, Island Place Tower, is located at the junction with King's Road. The headquarters of the Customs and Excise Department are located in the section of the street between Marble and Java Road. The facility commenced operation at the end of 2010 and was officially opened on 21 February 2011.

Several urban parks are located along the street:
 King's Road Playground, between King's Road and Marble Road
 Tin Chiu Street Playground, between Java Road and Marble Road (proposed to be redeveloped as a 110-metre-high residential building, as at 2016) 
 Tin Chiu Street Children's Playground, north of Java Road

See also

 List of streets and roads in Hong Kong

References

Roads on Hong Kong Island
Tsat Tsz Mui